Charles Lewis Hill (September 5, 1869 – June 1, 1957) was an American politician who, during 1910s, received the Prohibition Party nominations for Wisconsin governor and senator.

Biography
Hill was born in Rosendale, Wisconsin. He attended the University of Wisconsin-Madison and became president of the National Dairy Association and served as a delegate to the World's Dairy Congress in 1931. He also authored the book The Guernsey Breed. Hill died in Elkhorn, Wisconsin.

Political candidacy
Hill ran for Governor of Wisconsin in 1912, losing to incumbent Francis E. McGovern. In 1914 and 1916, Hill was a candidate for the United States Senate from Wisconsin, losing to Paul O. Husting in 1914 and to incumbent Robert M. La Follette, Sr. in 1916. Hill was a member of the Prohibition Party.

References

External links

People from Rosendale, Wisconsin
Wisconsin Prohibitionists
University of Wisconsin–Madison alumni
1869 births
1957 deaths